Toft is a civil parish in Cheshire East, England. It contains eight buildings that are recorded in the National Heritage List for England as designated listed buildings.  Of these, one is listed at Grade II*, the middle of the three grades, and the others are at Grade II.  The major building in the parish is Toft Hall; this, its stable block and a bridge on the approach road are listed.  The rest of the parish is rural, and the other listed buildings are houses, a church and a milepost.

Key

Buildings

References

Citations

Sources

 

Listed buildings in the Borough of Cheshire East
Lists of listed buildings in Cheshire